The Cathedral Basilica of Our Lady of St. John of the Lakes  also called San Juan de los Lagos Cathedral It is a Catholic church located in the city of San Juan de los Lagos, in the state of Jalisco, Mexico, headquarters of the diocese of San Juan de los Lagos. This Cathedral-Basilica ranks second in the number of visitors in the country (more than 7 million pilgrims a year) after the Basilica of Our Lady of Guadalupe.

The first shrine was built by Diego de Camarena in 1642, now known as the chapel of the First Miracle (capilla del Primer Milagro). Later, in 1682, he completed the construction of the second sanctuary, which is now the parish of San Juan Bautista. In the period 1732–1769, Carlos Cervantes, bishop of Guadalajara, was responsible for the construction of the current basilica. This earned the rank of cathedral 1972, through the Apostolic Constitution of Pope Paul VI.

See also
Roman Catholicism in Mexico
Cathedral Basilica of Our Lady

References

Roman Catholic cathedrals in Mexico
San Juan de los Lagos
Roman Catholic churches completed in 1642
17th-century Roman Catholic church buildings in Mexico